Daybreak is a 1933 Chinese silent film directed by Sun Yu for the Lianhua Film Company and made in a pro-KMT studio. The film stars Li Lili, one of the biggest silent film stars of the period, was a star vehicle for Li Lili, and was also the seventh film of director Sun Yu, who was the best known auteur of Shanghai Cinema during the 1920s.

The film Daybreak was created in the commemoration and celebration of the Party's successful completion in the Northern Expedition. Director Sun Yu's films were intended for nationalist propaganda and presents a narrative of redemption as a soft film - the concept where cinema is created as a form of entertainment and a means of aesthetic presentation above all else. The narrative openness encourages and allows cinematic audiences to develop their own political interpretations and in this film, for spectators to produce 'left wing' or 'pro-CCP' messages to emerge from its mise en abyme.

It follows a young country girl from a rural fishing village, Lingling (played by Li Lili) as she moves to the glittering city of Shanghai with her boyfriend Zhang (played by Gao Zhanfei). Lingling falls into an unfortunate path, as Zhang drifts into revolutionary circles. Upon arriving to the city, Lingling's own sister sold her to the boss who intoxicates her, rapes her, and forces her into prostitution before eventually becoming a martyr for the coming revolution.

An English-subtitled version of the film is available on YouTube.

Plot 
Lingling's rural fishing village was devastated by war and she decided to move to Shanghai in hopes for a better life. She is shown the city's bright lights on the Bund and eventually, finds a job working at a factory. Lingling's life was turned upside down when she was sold by her own sister, intoxicated and raped by the boss, and sold to a brothel.

Ironically, her role as a prostitute allowed her to climb into a higher social-class working as a high-class sex worker. In this role, Lingling begins build her wealth and social status, which she hopes to use in helping others including her former factory friends and those less fortunate. Lingling took advantage of an opportunity in helping her former country lover Zhang, by hiding him from the warlord's investigators. As a result, Lingling was incriminated as a revolutionist and was sentenced to death. The executioner Superintendent, Luo Peng, explains that the execution of Lingling would simply become a martyr for the people and fuel their revolutionary rages, but his voice was ignored and was told to continue the execution by his superiors. At the end of the film, Lingling requests the firing squad to shoot only when she is smiling her best. Lingling's action inspire Luo Peng and encourages the firing squad to turn their guns towards the oppressive warlord instead, but Luo Peng failed and was shot by his superior. Lingling's last words were that revolutions are endless, another will rise when you take one down, and was executed next to Luo Peng.

Cast 
 Li Lili - as Lingling, the film's heroine, an innocent, rural, pure, and hopeful young fishing village girl who experiences the darker side of Shanghai. 
 Gao Zhanfei - as Zhang, Lingling's country lover
 Ye Juanjuan
 Yuan Congmei
 Law Pang
 Langen Han
 Liu Chi-Chuen
 Guilin Wang

Theme 
Daybreak incorporates various symbolic interpretations throughout the film. It links the trope of the female protagonist to a persistent discussion on deception and performance in a social and political aspect, and particularly, the 'country girl' and 'modern girl' is used to create the contested notions between the social and political stance.  The underlying mechanism or purpose in using this trope is the representation of the woman protagonist as a homo sacer. Lingling can be viewed as a homo sacer, where she was the 'country girl' that was pure and pre-modernized at the country side and when she moves to the city, she becomes the 'modern girl' that was corrupted and modernized. In this sense, Lingling was an example of how a country virgin has been corrupted by the city into simply a means or medium of exchange in a misogynistic world.

Daybreak, literally, refers to the morning when daylight first appears in the morning. The film portrays that the city of Shanghai is covered by physical and political darkness waiting for daybreak and the arrival of freedom as the narration is intertitled with drawn pictures of the Shanghai skylines. Lingling's execution appears to take place after daybreak as well, which suggests that any hope of redemption represented by the coming of the morning daylight is a meaningless illusion and expectation as she will be executed shortly.

Translations 
Long unavailable in the United States except in poor video quality, Daybreak was eventually released on region free DVD by Cinema Epoch in the United States on 8 May 2007. The disc features English subtitles and also includes Shen Xiling's film, Crossroads.

A free version of the film with English subtitles is available on YouTube.

References

External links 
 
 
 
 Daybreak from the Chinese Movie Database

1933 films
Chinese silent films
Chinese drama films
Films directed by Sun Yu
1933 drama films
Films set in Shanghai
Lianhua Film Company films
Chinese black-and-white films
Silent drama films